Notes on the Folklore of the Fjort is a book by Richard Edward Dennett (introduction by Mary H. Kingsley) published in 1898.

It contains more than 30 traditional stories from French Congo which were collected by the Folklore Society of London.

External links 
Notes on the Folklore of the Fjort (entire text)

1898 books
Mythology books
French Congo